= Zaure Omarova =

Zaure Sadvokasovna Omarova (Russian: Зауре Садвокасовна Омарова; 28 November 1924 – 29 October 2008) was a Soviet and Kazakhstani politician.

She served as Minister of Social Security.
